Lake Wildwood is a census-designated place (CDP) in Nevada County, California, United States. The population was 4,991 at the 2010 census, up from 4,868 at the 2000 census.

Lake Wildwood is mainly a gated community and news about the CDP is published in a twice a month newspaper, The Wildwood Independent. Local businesses and residences are listed in the annual "Penn Valley Area Directory" published by "Pine Tree Press".

History
Lake Wildwood was laid out by property developers in the 1960s.

In September 1988, the 49er Fire was accidentally started by a homeless and schizophrenic local man near Highway 49. The fire went on to burn well over a hundred homes and more than 33,000 acres in Nevada County, including many homes in the Lake Wildwood area.

Geography
Lake Wildwood is located at  (39.234885, -121.203026).

Demographics

2010
The 2010 United States Census reported that Lake Wildwood had a population of 4,991. The racial makeup of Lake Wildwood was 4,726 (94.7%) White, 17 (0.3%) African American, 46 (0.9%) Native American, 56 (1.1%) Asian, 10 (0.2%) Pacific Islander, 32 (0.6%) from other races, and 104 (2.1%) from two or more races. Hispanic or Latino of any race were 272 persons (5.4%).

The Census reported that 4,988 people (99.9% of the population) lived in households, 3 (0.1%) lived in non-institutionalized group quarters, and 0 (0%) were institutionalized.

There were 2,225 households, out of which 462 (20.8%) had children under the age of 18 living in them, 1,463 (65.8%) were opposite-sex married couples living together, 125 (5.6%) had a female householder with no husband present, 57 (2.6%) had a male householder with no wife present.  There were 64 (2.9%) unmarried opposite-sex partnerships, and 15 (0.7%) same-sex married couples or partnerships. 496 households (22.3%) were made up of individuals, and 334 (15.0%) had someone living alone who was 65 years of age or older. The average household size was 2.24.  There were 1,645 families (73.9% of all households); the average family size was 2.58.

The population was spread out, with 843 people (16.9%) under the age of 18, 204 people (4.1%) aged 18 to 24, 689 people (13.8%) aged 25 to 44, 1,412 people (28.3%) aged 45 to 64, and 1,843 people (36.9%) who were 65 years of age or older.  The median age was 58.4 years. For every 100 females, there were 92.6 males.  For every 100 females age 18 and over, there were 91.3 males.

The homeowner vacancy rate was 3.2%; the rental vacancy rate was 6.8%.  3,937 people (78.9% of the population) lived in owner-occupied housing units and 1,051 people (21.1%) lived in rental housing units.

2000
As of the census of 2000, there were 4,868 people, 2,157 households, and 1,688 families residing in the CDP. The racial makeup of the CDP was 96.53% White, 0.23% African American, 0.39% Native American, 0.78% Asian, 0.02% Pacific Islander, 0.18% from other races, and 1.87% from two or more races. Hispanic or Latino of any race were 2.28% of the population.

There were 2,157 households, out of which 18.5% had children under the age of 18 living with them, 71.0% were married couples living together, 5.3% had a female householder with no husband present, and 21.7% were non-families. 18.5% of all households were made up of individuals, and 11.8% had someone living alone who was 65 years of age or older.  The average household size was 2.26 and the average family size was 2.52.

In the CDP, the population was spread out, with 16.4% under the age of 18, 3.3% from 18 to 24, 13.9% from 25 to 44, 29.6% from 45 to 64, and 36.9% who were 65 years of age or older.  The median age was 57 years. For every 100 females, there were 91.7 males.  For every 100 females age 18 and over, there were 89.8 males.

The median income for a household in the CDP was $58,290, and the median income for a family was $61,972. Males had a median income of $53,162 versus $34,167 for females. The per capita income for the CDP was $32,167.  About 1.9% of families and 3.0% of the population were below the poverty line, including 1.7% of those under age 18 and 1.5% of those age 65 or over.

Politics

Lake Wildwood is represented on the Nevada County Board of Supervisors by Republican Hank Weston, a retired fire chief.

References

External links
 Official website

Census-designated places in Nevada County, California
Gated communities in California
Census-designated places in California